EggPlantEgg (Taiwanese Hokkien: 茄仔卵) is a Taiwanese band founded in 2012 in Taipei, composed of lead vocalist Ng Ki-pin, guitarist A-ren Tsai, and guitarist A-der Hsieh. The band is known for spearheading a renaissance in Hokkien pop.

The band has been on a hiatus since September, 2022

Musical career 

EggPlantEgg was founded in 2012 by five students at Taipei Municipal Song Shan Senior High School, with Ng Ki-pin as the sole remaining original band member. 

The band released their debut studio album, Cartoon Character, in July 2017. The band won the Golden Melody Awards for Best New Artist and Best Taiwanese Album in 2018.

Jean Lai, the band's drummer, announced his retirement on 3 April 2019.

Members 

 Ng Ki-pin, lead vocalist
 A-ren Tsai, guitarist
 A-der Hsieh, guitarist

Discography 

 Cartoon Character (2017)
 We're Getting Married Later (2019)

References

External links 

 

Taiwanese rock music groups
Taiwanese indie rock groups
Taiwanese alternative rock groups
Jazz fusion ensembles
Mandopop musical groups
Taiwanese Hokkien-language bands
Musical groups established in 2012
Musical groups disestablished in 2022